Haknam High School is a public high school in Daegu, South Korea. The school has roughly 70 teachers, and 1,200 students. Its motto is "high ideal, endless devoting oneself."

History
The plan to establish the school was approved on 8 November 2001, and the establishment process was completed on 4 March 2003 when the first entrance ceremony was held.

Symbol
The symbol tree of the school is a pine. This shows four meanings: the tree that has lived with people, stability and flexibility together, tough willingness and a brave heart, fidelity and integrity. Alongside this, the symbol flower is the plum blossom and also has four meanings: stability, willingness, resolute and lofty elegance, purity and nobility, attractive scent is that.

Alumni
 Bae Joo-hyun

References

Sources
https://web.archive.org/web/20090323061612/http://www.haknam.hs.kr/

Educational institutions established in 2003
High schools in Daegu
2003 establishments in South Korea